Alexander Bronstein (born 15 June 1954, in Leningrad, USSR) is a businessperson. An Estonian citizen, he currently lives in Tallinn, Estonia. He heads the Solway Group, a controversial mining company.

Biography
Alexander Bronstein was born in 1954 in Leningrad. He is son of academic and World War II veteran :ru:Бронштейн, Михаил Лазаревич (Mikhail Bronstein). Anti-semitism drove the family to Tallinn, Estonia in 1956. In 1976 Bronstein graduated from Tartu State University with a degree in Applied Mathematics, gaining a PhD in 1981. He started working in the nonferrous-metal industry in the late 1980s.  He held a number of key posts within the metalworking business before becoming a co-founder of Solway Investment Group, managing assets in Central, Eastern Europe, South America and South-Eastern Asia. According to Finance magazine, Bronstein's net worth was US$150 million in 2007.

Career
 2009 – : "Solway Investment Group LTD", then "Solway Holding LTD", chairman of the board
 2002–2008: Solway Management LLC, chairman of the board
 2003–2007: "SUAL Holding Ltd.", chairman of the board
 2002 – : Raznoimport Trading LTD (UK), CEO
 1998–2000: Raznoimport LTD (UK), CEO in the Eastern Europe
 1995–1997: Shanton International LTD, Director of the German representative office
 1994–1995: Von Tsurikov Consulting (Germany), CFO
 1991–1993: LTR Handels GmbH (Germany), CEO
 1991 – : KTH Handels GmbH (Germany), CFO
 1989-1980: Estland – West (joint German-Estonian venture), CEO
 1997 – : leading positions at Flora-Moscow Bank, Volkhov Aluminium, Pikalevo Alumina, Siasky CBK, Volgograd Aluminium, JSC Metallurg, Klyuchevskiy ferroalloy plant.

Public work
 1975–1976: Ministry of Finance of Estonia – intern
 1976—1988: Ministry of Forestry and Environment of Estonia – moved up from an intern position to become department chief 
 2002:Vice President of Eurasian Jewish Congress;
 2007: Vice President of World Jewish Congress;
 2012: President of EIPA's steering committee;
 2013: President of IEPA: Israel Press Association (Belgium)
 Sponsoring a Keren Ha-Jesod charity foundation.

Recognition

2007: awarded an Order of the White Star by the Estonian government.

Charity
Alexander Bronstein has played an active role in Jewish community life in Estonia since 2004. He funded the construction of the first Estonian synagogue and Jewish community centre (2005–07) to replace the building destroyed during World War II. The synagogue was named Beit Bela" in honour of Bronstein's mother.  In 2006, Bronstein was one of the six sponsors who pledged support for Israeli orphans whose parents were killed by Hamas troops.  He has supported the "Peres Centre" in Jaffa and the President's Conference in Jerusalem since 2008.  In 2006 he organized and sponsored the European Israeli Friends forum, which brought together more than 500 members of the European Parliament in Jerusalem.

Academic work
 "Ecologization of the economy: methods of regional management", Nauka Publishing House, 1990, Moscow

Family
 Father: Mikhail Bronstein, Estonian academic
 Mother: Bela Barskaya

References

External links

 Volgograd Aluminum divided into two
 All the more valuable metals
 Russian billionaires, according to Forbes
 Top 500 Finance 2007
 Solway Holding LTD
 Mihhail Bronštein
 Riiklike autasude andmine
 Tallinna Uus Sünagoog
 Eesti Vabariigi teenetemärgiks on kuusnurk
 The Jewish Traveler: Tallinn
 New Synagogue Opened in Tallinn
 Cilja Laud
 Israel's Chief Rabbi Rav Metzger and main donator Alexander Bronstein
 Estland: In Tallinn steht jetzt die erste und einzige Synagoge des Landes
 Erste Synagoge Estlands seit 1944
 New synagogue in Estonia
 President of the Republic At the opening of the Jewish Synagogue

University of Tartu
1954 births
Estonian billionaires
Estonian businesspeople
Russian Jews
Living people